Katie Taylor (born 2 July 1986) is an Irish professional boxer and former footballer. She is a two-weight world champion and the current undisputed lightweight champion, having held the WBA title since 2017; the IBF title since 2018; and the WBC, WBO, and The Ring magazine titles since 2019, as well as having held the WBO junior-welterweight title in 2019. Following her victory over Delfine Persoon in 2019, she became one of only eight boxers in history (female or male) to hold all four major world titles in boxing—WBA, WBC, IBF, and WBO—simultaneously.

In her amateur boxing career, Taylor won five consecutive gold medals at the Women's World Championships, gold six times at the European Championships, and gold five times at the European Union Championships. Hugely popular in Ireland, she is credited with raising the profile of women's boxing at home and abroad. Regarded as the outstanding Irish athlete of her generation, she was the flag bearer for Ireland at the 2012 London Olympics opening ceremony before going on to win an Olympic gold medal in the lightweight division.

Taylor turned professional in 2016 under Matchroom Boxing. As of March 2023, Taylor is ranked as the world's best active female lightweight by BoxRec and the best active female boxer, pound-for-pound, by The Ring and BoxRec. She is known for her fast-paced, aggressive boxing style.

Early life
Taylor was born on 2 July 1986 in Bray, County Wicklow, the daughter of Irish mother Bridget (née Cranley) and English-born father Pete Taylor. She has an older sister named Sarah and two older brothers named Lee and Peter, the latter of whom is a mathematics professor at Dublin City University. Her father, who was born near Leeds and grew up in Birmingham, first visited Bray to work with his father in the amusement arcades on the seafront. After meeting and marrying Bridget, he decided to settle in Bray. In 1986, he became an Irish senior light heavyweight champion boxer. Originally an electrician by trade, he eventually became Taylor's full-time boxing coach. He also coached Adam Nolan who, like Taylor, represented Ireland at the 2012 Summer Olympics. Bridget also developed an interest in boxing and became one of the earliest female referees and judges in Ireland.

Between 1999 and 2005, Taylor attended St. Kilian's Community School in Bray. Her three older siblings all attended the same school. As well as boxing and playing association football at school, she also played ladies' Gaelic football and camogie with her local GAA clubs, Bray Emmets and Fergal Ógs. She was a member of Bray Runners, a local athletics club, and several American colleges reportedly offered her sports scholarships while she was still studying at St Killian's. However, she opted instead to attend University College Dublin, known for its sports scholarship programme, which she qualified for via her Leaving Cert results. As her sporting career began to take off, she chose not to complete her studies at UCD.

Amateur boxing career
Taylor first began boxing in 1998, aged 12. Her father coached her and her two older brothers, Lee and Peter, at St Fergal's Boxing Club, which operated out of a former boathouse in Bray. At 15, in 2001, she fought in the first officially sanctioned female boxing match in Ireland, at the National Stadium, and defeated Alanna Audley from Belfast.

List of title fights
2005 European Amateur Boxing Championship
Taylor's first noteworthy success was at the 2005 European Amateur Championships, in Tønsberg, Norway. She won the gold medal, defeating Eva Wahlström of Finland in the final of the 60 kg lightweight class.

2005 AIBA Women's World Boxing Championship
Later in 2005, at the World Amateur Championships in Podolsk, Russia, Taylor advanced to the quarter-finals in the 60 kg weight class. Here she lost against Kang Kum-Hui, who remains the only boxer to have defeated Taylor at the World Championships.

2006 European Amateur Boxing Championship
At the 2006 European Amateur Championships in Warsaw, Poland, Taylor won her second successive gold medal by stopping reigning world champion Tatiana Chalaya of Russia, also collecting the tournament's Best Boxer award.

2006 AIBA Women's World Boxing Championship
At the 2006 World Women's Boxing Championship, contested in New Delhi, India, Taylor became Ireland's first World Champion, defeating Chalaya again in the semi-final and then Erica Farias of Argentina in the 60 kg final.

2007 European Amateur Boxing Championship
In 2007, she won her third successive European Championship title in Denmark.

2008 Women's European Union Amateur Boxing Championships
2008 saw Taylor win her first European Union gold medal, contested in August in Liverpool, England. Here she defeated Cindy Orain of France.

2008 AIBA Women's World Boxing Championship
Taylor went on to claim her second World title at the 2008 AIBA Women's World Boxing Championship, contested in November at Ningbo, China. In the 60 kg weight class, she defeated China's Cheng Dong in the final match which was her 100th bout.

2009: Entering the public eye
On 21 March 2009 at The Dublin O2, Taylor won a 27–3 win over three-time Pan-American champion Caroline Barry of the United States on the undercard of a pro WBA super bantamweight world title fight between Bernard Dunne of Ireland and Ricardo Cordoba of Panama. Speaking after the fight, Taylor, who had stopped Barry in the final of the 2006 World Championships in New Delhi, said she was stunned by the welcome she received from Irish boxing fans. She said: "I couldn't believe the reception I got – it was an amazing experience for me. I knew it was going to be a tough fight and well done to her for never backing off."

2009 Women's European Union Amateur Boxing Championships
Taylor defended her European Union title in 2009. She beat home favourite, Bulgaria's Denitsa Elisayeva, in the July tournament hosted in Pazardzhik.

2010 AIBA Women's World Boxing Championship
On 18 September 2010, Taylor went on to claim her third successive World title at the 2010 AIBA Women's World Boxing Championship, in Barbados. In the 60 kg weight class, she again defeated China's Cheng Dong in the final match. This was Taylor's 100th career win.

2011 EU Women Boxing Championships
Taylor won the gold medal at the EU Women Boxing Championships in Katowice, Poland in 2011.

2012 AIBA Women's World Boxing Championship
On 19 May 2012, Taylor won her fourth successive World title at the 2012 AIBA Women's World Boxing Championship, in Qinhuangdao China. In the 60 kg weight class, she defeated Russian southpaw Sofya Ochigava.

2012 Summer Olympics

Taylor qualified for the 2012 Summer Olympics in London, the first time women's boxing had been considered for inclusion. Crowds gathered on the streets of her hometown Bray to watch her progress on giant screens erected especially for the occasion. Coddle released a single called "Katie Taylor Ireland's Boxing Legend". The song reached number 42 in the Irish Charts.

Taylor's first appearance at the 2012 Summer Olympics came on 6 August, after a first round bye. She achieved an impressive 26–15 victory (R1: 5–2, R2: 5–5, R3: 9–4, R4: 7–4) over Great Britain's Natasha Jonas, booking her place in the semi final and guaranteeing her, at least, an Olympic bronze medal. Fans of Taylor produced record noise levels at the Olympics.

In the semi-final on 8 August 2012, she proved far too good for Tajikistan's Mavzuna Chorieva and won in a 17–9 victory (R1: 3–1, R2: 4–2, R3: 6–3, R4: 4–3), booking her place in the final and guaranteeing her, at least, an Olympic silver medal.

Taylor defeated Russia's Sofya Ochigava in the final bout by 10–8 (R1: 2–2, R2: 1–2, R3: 4–1, R4: 3–3) on 9 August 2012, winning an Olympic gold medal, and becoming the first ever Olympic female lightweight champion.

On her return to Dublin with the rest of the Olympic squad she got into the cockpit of the plane and leaned out the window waving an Irish flag.

2014 AIBA Women's World Boxing Championships
On 24 November 2014, Taylor won her fifth straight lightweight title in South Korea at the 2014 AIBA Women's World Boxing Championships, defeating Yana Allekseevna of Azerbaijan. The final scoreline was 40–36, 39–37, and 39–37 in her favour.

2015 European Games
On 27 June 2015, Taylor won the lightweight title in Azerbaijan at the inaugural European Games, defeating Estelle Mosely of France. The final scoreline was 40–36, 40–36, and 39–37 in her favour.

2016 AIBA Women's World Boxing Championships
On 24 May 2016, Taylor qualified for the 2016 Summer Olympics after defeating Victoria Torres in the quarter-finals of the lightweight division at the 2016 AIBA Women's World Boxing Championships. Two days later, Taylor lost to Estelle Mossely in the semi-finals which ended her quest for a sixth World title in a row.

2016 Summer Olympics

On 15 August 2016, Taylor lost 2–1 in the quarter-finals to Mira Potkonen of Finland and did not advance.

Professional boxing career

Taylor made her professional debut on 26 November 2016, scoring a third-round technical knockout (TKO) at the Wembley Arena in London.

In her second professional bout she faced Viviane Obenauf on 10 December 2016 at the Manchester Arena, Manchester. The fight was televised live on Sky Sports Box Office as part of the undercard for the Anthony Joshua vs. Éric Molina heavyweight world title fight. In a bout which saw Taylor score a knockdown in the second round after Obenauf appeared to slip, and the latter suffer a cut to her left eye following an apparent clash of heads, Taylor won by a shutout six-round points decision (PTS) with the referee scoring the bout 60–53.
 
She scored two more wins in March 2017—against Monica Gentili via fifth-round TKO and Milena Koliva via PTS over eight rounds—before facing Nina Meinke for the vacant WBA International female lightweight title on 29 April 2017 at the Wembley Stadium. The bout served as a final eliminator for the WBA female lightweight title and was televised live on Sky Sports Box Office as part of the undercard for the Anthony Joshua vs. Wladimir Klitschko world title fight. Taylor controlled the contest from the opening bell with her speed and combination punches. Meinke suffered a cut in the fifth round from an accidental clash of heads. With a badly swollen right eye, and after being on the receiving end of a flurry of punches, referee Howard Foster called a halt to the contest in the seventh round to save Meinke from further punishment, handing Taylor a TKO victory.

WBA lightweight champion

Taylor vs. Sánchez 
Following a third-round stoppage victory via corner retirement (RTD) against Jasmine Clarkson in July, Taylor faced former two-weight world champion Anahí Ester Sánchez for the vacant WBA female lightweight title on 28 October 2017 at the Principality Stadium in Cardiff, Wales. Sánchez was set to defend the title on the night, however, she failed to make weight for the fight and was subsequently stripped by the WBA, with the title on the line for Taylor only. The bout was televised live on Sky Sports Box Office as part of the undercard for Anthony Joshua vs. Carlos Takam. After controlling the first round with her speed and power, Taylor dropped the former champion to the canvas with a body shot in the second. Sánchez was hurt again in the next round after a right hand from Taylor caused her to stagger. Sánchez had some success in the fifth, landing right hands to force Taylor onto the back foot. Taylor regained control for the rest of the fight to secure a wide unanimous decision (UD) victory, with all three judges scoring the bout 99–90 to hand Taylor her first world title.

Taylor vs. McCaskill 
The first defence of her title came against future undisputed female welterweight champion Jessica McCaskill on 13 December at the York Hall in London. After a closely contested first round, Taylor went down to the canvas in the second in what was ruled as a slip. Taylor began to take control with her speed and power before McCaskill found success and hurt the champion in the sixth round. Taylor received a point deduction in the seventh for excessive holding, before keeping McCaskill at a distance and fighting at range for the next three rounds to secure a UD victory. One judge scored the bout 98–91 and the other two scored it 97–92.

Unified champion

Taylor vs. Bustos 
Her next fight was a unification bout against reigning IBF female lightweight champion Victoria Bustos on 28 April 2018 at the Barclays Center in New York City. Taylor controlled the majority of the fight with her speed from a distance, only encountering difficulty in rounds seven and eight after engaging Bustos at close range. Taylor secured the win with a wide UD to add the IBF title to her growing collection, with two judges scoring the bout 99–91 and the third scoring it 98–92.

She made three successful defences of the her titles in 2018; defeating Kimberly Connor via third-round TKO in July; former WBO female featherweight champion Cindy Serrano by UD in October; and former WBC female super-featherweight champion Eva Wahlström in December.

Taylor vs. Volante 
Taylor's first fight of 2019 was another unification bout, facing WBO female lightweight champion Rose Volante on 15 March at the Liacouras Center in Philadelphia, Pennsylvania. Taylor started the fight strong, using her combination punching and movement to take control, dropping Volante to the canvas with a right hand in the opening round. The second round saw Taylor stay behind the jab, keeping her opponent at range as Volante attempted to close the distance and fight at close quarters. Volante switched tactics in the third round, staying in the centre of the ring and waiting for Taylor to press the action. Taylor obliged, but the Irish champion's footwork allowed her to get in-and-out before Volante could land any meaningful punches. After much of the same in the fourth, Taylor began to pile on the pressure in the fifth, switching her attacks from head to body to find an opening with a powerful body shot to hurt Volante. Round six saw Taylor pierce the guard of Volante with straight punches, leaving her opponent with a bloodied nose. Volante had moments of success in the seventh round with heavy punches to the body of Taylor, before the Irish woman resumed her attacks to regain control. Taylor continued her success in the eighth, landing an overhand right followed by a rapid six-punch combination. After Volante was on the receiving end of a flurry of punches, and with a cut over her nose which appeared to be the result of a clash of heads, referee Benjy Esteves stepped in and called a halt to the contest to hand Taylor a ninth-round TKO victory and her third world title.

In the post-fight interview, Taylor declared her intentions of becoming the undisputed female lightweight champion, saying; "Now we can start talking about that fight, Persoon. That name's been coming up over the last two years. I've got the three belts, she's got the WBC belt, so we have to get that fight on next."

Undisputed champion

Taylor vs. Persoon I 
In December 2018, Irish journalist Evanne Ní Chuilinn stated that Taylor accused Delfine Persoon of turning down a "life-changing" amount of money to fight her. Later Persoon claimed to have offered $100,000 to Taylor for a fight. Taylor's manager stated that Taylor wouldn't even get out of bed for this sum. On 15 April 2019, Taylor and Persoon agreed to a lightweight title unification bout, to take place on 1 June at Madison Square Garden as undercard for the Anthony Joshua vs. Andy Ruiz Jr. heavyweight title fight. In addition to all four sanctioning body's titles being on the line, The Ring magazine belt was also at stake.

Persoon's management labelled Taylor's team "totally disrespectful" and claimed "psychological warfare" after a series of demands late in the fight week. This included a claim of forcing Persoon to switch hotels on the grounds that Taylor was staying in the same hotel, and demands for an additional blood test and to prove Persoon has exercise asthma. Taylor's team denied expelling Persoon's team from the hotel, but claimed that there was a clause in the contract allowing them to do so which Persoon's manager should have been aware of. Although, in a different interview Taylor's team stated it was not done by them, but by the organizers and that they had no idea about this forced move out of the hotel. Taylor's team accused Persoon's manager of purposefully attempting to stir controversy by booking his fighter into the hotel Taylor was staying at.

From the opening bell, Taylor came under relentless pressure from Persoon, forcing the Irish champion to fight off the back foot and rely on counter punching. After having success in the first round, Taylor began to have difficulties with Persoon's pressure in the second and third, with the Belgian champion employing roughhouse tactics in the clinch. Taylor suffered a cut to her forehead in the fourth round. In the fifth, with Taylor ahead on all three judges' scorecards, she spent the majority of the round with her back against the ropes, still engaging with Persoon and having success. Taylor found more success in the sixth, scoring with counter punches while making Persoon miss as the Belgian began to tire. The tables turned in the eighth as Taylor also looked to be tiring, with the highlight of the round being a solid right hand from Persoon to stop Taylor in her tracks. The Irish champion rallied back in the ninth to land her trademark rapid-fire combinations. The tenth and final round was a back-and-forth affair as both fighters traded punches to try and close the show as the stronger fighter. After the final bell rang Taylor secured the win via majority decision (MD), with two judges scoring the bout in favour of Taylor at 96–94 while the third judge scored it a draw at 95–95, crowning Taylor the first undisputed female lightweight champion. According to CompuBox stats, Taylor landed 103 of 410 (25.1%) punches, while Persoon landed 116 of 586 (19.8%).

Controversy ensued regarding the decision, with some ringside media outlets and boxers feeling Persoon did enough to get the win. Former two-weight world champion Carl Frampton said, "In my opinion, the judges have got it wrong", and described the decision as "disgraceful". Former two-weight world champion David Haye said, "That is not the sight you want to see where someone has given everything in the gym but they do not get the decision because of the political power. Delfine Persoon is going to be heartbroken by that." ESPN's unofficial scorecard also had Persoon winning by a small margin. DAZN commentator Brian Kenny also thought Persoon had won, but explained that the fight was close and did not dispute the judges' decision. Michael Woods, writing for The Ring magazine, argued the decision "was no robbery".

Two-weight world champion

Taylor vs. Linardatou 
For her next fight, Taylor elected to move up in weight, facing WBO female junior-welterweight champion Christina Linardatou on 2 November 2019 at the Manchester Arena. The champion started the fight as the aggressor, forcing Taylor to fight off the back foot. The Irish challenger found success at the end of the round with two solid right hands as the bell rang. Taylor started to find her rhythm in the second round, scoring punches while using her fast footwork to make her opponent miss. The third round saw more of the same with Taylor staying behind the jab and landing left hooks. Linardatou found success in the fourth and fifth rounds, landing multiple right hands and leaving Taylor with swelling above her right eye. Taylor began regaining control in the sixth, using her footwork and landing her signature rapid combinations. Round eight saw Taylor plant her feet and trade punches, landing a combination of power punches before taking a solid right hand from the champion that stopped Taylor in her tracks. After critical comments from her corner for taking too many punches in the eighth round, Taylor got back to her boxing for the next two rounds, coasting to a UD victory with the scorecards reading 97–93, 97–93, and 96–94. With the win Taylor became only the third boxer from Ireland, after Steve Collins and Carl Frampton, to capture world titles in two weight divisions.

Undisputed lightweight title defences

Taylor vs. Persoon II 
Taylor was scheduled to defend her lightweight titles against seven-division world champion Amanda Serrano on 2 May 2020 at the Manchester Arena. However, due to the COVID-19 pandemic the bout was postponed and rescheduled to 4 July, with the venue changing to the Matchroom Sport headquarters in Brentwood, Essex. The bout was once again postponed, with a new proposed date of 22 August. After negotiations began to break down, Taylor's promoter, Eddie Hearn, revealed he was in talks with Delfine Persoon's team to secure a rematch for the 22 August date. On 9 July, it was confirmed that the Taylor vs. Persoon rematch would take place on 22 August at the Matchroom Sport headquarters in Brentwood, Essex, airing live on Sky Sports Box Office as part of the undercard for Dillian Whyte vs. Alexander Povetkin.

The match went to Taylor by unanimous points decision, 98–93, 96–94, 96–94, and Persoon conceded that Taylor had clearly won, and deserved to retain the slate of titles held - "she is so good. I have no problem with this result". Two-time world heavyweight champion Anthony Joshua described it as "another fantastic fight between these two great boxers".

Taylor vs. Gutierrez 
Taylor defended her titles on 14 November 2020 at The SSE Arena in London against Miriam Gutiérrez. Taylor dropped her opponent to the canvas with a left hook at the end of the fourth round en route to a unanimous decision victory, with the judges' scorecards reading 100–89, 100–90, and 99–91. During the post-fight interview, Eddie Hearn listed potential opponents for Taylor's next fight, which included Amanda Serrano, a rematch with undisputed welterweight champion Jessica McCaskill, former undisputed welterweight champion Cecilia Braekhus, or a crossover fight with MMA fighter Cris Cyborg.

Taylor vs. Jonas 
Taylor defended her undisputed lightweight titles at the AO Arena against Natasha Jonas, an opponent she had previously faced in the 2012 London Olympics, on 1 May 2021 in Manchester. Following a highly competitive fight, Taylor won by a narrow unanimous decision (96–94, 95–94, 95–94) to retain her undisputed lightweight titles for the second time.

Taylor vs. Han 
In her first fight to air exclusively on DAZN, Taylor defeated Jennifer Han in front of a crowd of 20,000 at the Headingley Rugby League Stadium in Leeds, England to retain her lightweight titles. Taylor won decisively on all three scorecards (100-89) after flooring Han with a short right hook in the eighth round.

During her post-fight interview, Taylor said "I want the megafights and to be involved in the biggest fights out there. I'm confident I will end my career as unbeaten and undisputed world champion."

Taylor vs. Sharipova 
Taylor was next announced to be fighting Firuza Sharipova on 11 December 2021 at the M&S Bank Arena, Liverpool. Taylor defeated Sharipova via unanimous decision (98–92, 97–92, 96–93) to successfully defend her undisputed lightweight titles for the fifth time.

Taylor vs. Serrano 

Taylor defended her undisputed lightweight titles against seven-division world champion Amanda Serrano on 30 April 2022 at Madison Square Garden. The fight was the first women's boxing match to headline Madison Square Garden, and was described as the 'biggest women's fight of all time' in the build up. Taylor retained her titles with a split decision points verdict of 94–96 in favour of Serrano, and 97–93, and 96–93 in favour of Taylor. The bout was named Fight of the Year by Sports Illustrated.

Taylor vs. Carabajal 
Taylor successfully defended her undisputed lightweight titles for the seventh time against undefeated boxer, Karen Carabajal, on 29 October 2022 at the  OVO Arena, Wembley winning by unanimous decision (100–91, 98–92, and 99–91). In her post-fight interview, Taylor called for her next fight to be held in the 82,300 capacity Croke Park stadium in Dublin.

Taylor vs. Cameron 
Taylor was scheduled to defend her lightweight titles in a rematch against Amanda Serrano, following Serrano becoming the undisputed featherweight champion with a victory over Erika Cruz. However, in late February it was announced that Serrano had suffered an injury and the bout would not take place. On March 2, Taylor took to Instagram and publically challenged the undisputed super-lightweight champion Chantelle Cameron, who accepted. The bout was subsequently announced by Eddie Hearn on March 11 to be taking place at the 3Arena in Dublin on May 20 for Cameron's undisputed super-lightweight titles. The bout will be Taylor's first in her home country of Ireland and will see her attempt to become a two-weight undisputed world champion.

Professional boxing record

Association football

Club career
As a schoolgirl, Taylor played association football for St Fergal's and Newtown Juniors in the Wicklow and District Schoolboys League and Ballyfermot United in the Dublin and District Schoolboys league. Taylor played in teams with boys. She also represented the league in the Kennedy Cup, an inter–league competition, and won the league's Player of the Year award. At senior club level, Taylor played in the Dublin Women's Soccer League for Lourdes Celtic, St James's Gate, St Catherine's and Peamount United.
Taylor played for St James's Gate in the 2003 DWSL Premier Cup final against Dundalk City. Gate lost 3–2 after extra time. Taylor also played for Peamount United in the 2005 FAI Women's Cup final. However Peamount lost 1–0 to Dundalk City. In 2009 Taylor was a member of the St Catherine's squad that reached the FAI Women's Cup final. However, her boxing commitments saw her miss out on the final itself. In 2010, together with Nicola Sinnott, Áine O'Gorman, Sara Lawlor and Louise Quinn, Taylor was a member of the Peamount United squad that won a treble, winning the Dublin Women's Soccer League, the DWSL Premier Cup and the FAI Women's Cup.

International
Taylor represented the Republic of Ireland women's national football team at under-17, under-19 and senior levels. She was 14 when she played for the under-17s and 15 when she started playing for the under-19s. According to Taylor, her boxing training helped her football career because it made her physically strong enough to bridge the age gaps. On 25 September 2003, Taylor scored four goals for the Republic of Ireland under-19s in a 2004 UEFA Women's Under-19 Championship qualifier against Macedonia.

Between 2006 and 2009, Taylor made 11 appearances and scored 2 goals for the senior team. She made her senior international debut on 22 April 2006 against Switzerland in a 2007 FIFA Women's World Cup qualifier at Richmond Park. The Republic of Ireland won 2–0. In 2006 Taylor also played for the Republic of Ireland in a prestige away friendly against the United States. Taylor scored her first senior international goal on 1 April 2007 in a UEFA Women's Euro 2009 qualifier against Hungary at Tolka Park. Taylor's goal helped the Republic of Ireland win 2–1. She scored her second goal in the same qualifying campaign in a 4–1 defeat against in Italy on 16 February 2008. She was also sent-off in the same game. She made her final international appearance on 24 September 2009 when she came on as substitute in a 2011 FIFA Women's World Cup qualifier against Kazakhstan.

Other work
In 2002, at the age of 15, Taylor appeared on RTÉ's Sport Stream and discussed her dream of one day appearing at the Olympics. She was a coach on RTÉ's Charity Lords of the Ring in 2009, and appeared in a Lucozade Sport advertisement in 2011 alongside English rapper Tinie Tempah and American musician Travis Barker. She became the brand ambassador for Its4women, an online insurance company marketed at young women, in 2016. She appeared in advertisements for the company on both television and YouTube.

Personal life
Taylor and her family attend St. Mark's Church in Dublin, which is part of Assemblies of God, the world's largest Pentecostal denomination.

My Olympic Dream, Taylor's "illustrated memoir" with which she was helped by The Irish Times sports writer Johnny Watterson, was published by Simon & Schuster in 2012. In 2018, the documentary Katie was released, which chronicled her early life and journey to her first title shot. She has a fondness for the Irish language and once appeared on Bernard Dunne's show Bród Club to promote it.

On 15 June 2018, Taylor's father, Pete, was a victim in the Bray boxing club shooting. He was shot in the chest and arm, but ultimately survived.

Taylor is cousins with UFC flyweight Molly McCann.

Awards and honours

Individual
 2004 FAI International Football Awards – Under-19 Women's International Player of the Year
 2010 International Boxing Association (AIBA) World Female Boxer of the Year.
 2012 People of the Year Awards – Sportsperson of the Year
 2012 RTÉ Sports Person of the Year
 2012 Irish Book Awards – Irish Sports Book
 2013 Dublin City University Honorary degree, D.Phil. (hc)
 2014 The Irish Times/Irish Sports Council Sportswoman of the Year.
 2019 BWAA – Christy Martin Award / Female Fighter of the Year
 2020 RTÉ Sports Person of the Year
 2022 RTÉ Sports Person of the Year

Boxing medals

See also
 List of flag bearers for Ireland at the Olympics

References

External links

Katie Taylor's career in pictures at the Irish Independent
Katie Taylor's Olympic gold win in pictures at RTÉ

1986 births
Living people
Irish women boxers
Boxers at the 2012 Summer Olympics
Boxers at the 2016 Summer Olympics
Gaelic footballers who switched code
Irish evangelicals
Irish Pentecostals
Olympic boxers of Ireland
Olympic gold medalists for Ireland
Olympic medalists in boxing
People from Bray, County Wicklow
RTÉ Sports Person of the Year winners
Republic of Ireland women's association footballers
Republic of Ireland women's international footballers
Sportspeople from County Wicklow
Medalists at the 2012 Summer Olympics
AIBA Women's World Boxing Championships medalists
Peamount United F.C. players
Boxers at the 2015 European Games
European Games gold medalists for Ireland
European Games medalists in boxing
Irish people of English descent
Association footballers from County Wicklow
Bray Emmets Gaelic footballers
St Catherine's L.F.C. players
Dublin Women's Soccer League players
World lightweight boxing champions
World Boxing Association champions
International Boxing Federation champions
World Boxing Organization champions
World Boxing Council champions
The Ring (magazine) champions
Women's association football midfielders
Women's association football forwards
Republic of Ireland women's youth international footballers
St James's Gate F.C. players